Delestre is a surname. Notable people with the surname include:

Charles-Gaspard Delestre-Poirson (1790–1859), French playwright and theatre director
Dominique Delestre (born 1955), French racing driver
Jean-Baptiste Delestre (1800–1871), French artist and writer
Simon Delestre (born 1981), French equestrian

See also
Deletraz

References

French-language surnames